Leonidas of Rhodes (born 188 BC) was one of the most famous ancient Olympic runners. For four consecutive Olympiads (164–152 BC), he was champion of three foot races. He was hailed with the title "Triastes" (tripler). Leonidas is acclaimed by some to be one of the greatest sprinters of all time.

Olympic career
Competing in the Olympic Games of the 154th Olympiad in 164 BC, the  last of the "golden age" of the ancient Games, Leonidas captured the crown in three separate foot races: the stadion, the diaulos, and the hoplitodromos. He repeated this feat in the next three subsequent Olympics, in 160 BC, in 156 BC, and finally in 152 BC at the age of 36. Leonidas's lifetime record of twelve individual Olympic victory wreaths was unmatched in the ancient world.

His number of victories are a testament to his versatility as a runner. Philostratus the Athenian wrote in his Gymnastikos that Leonidas made all previous theories of runners' training and body types obsolete.  The stadion and the diaulos, foot races of some 200 and 400 meters  respectively, were best suited to sprinters, while the hoplitodromos (a diaulos performed with bronze armor and shield) required more muscular strength and endurance.

References

188 BC births
2nd-century BC deaths
2nd-century BC Rhodians
Ancient Olympic competitors
Ancient Rhodian athletes